Petra Kvitová was the defending champion, but she decided to play at the Hopman Cup instead.

Kaia Kanepi won the title, defeating Daniela Hantuchová in the final 6–2, 6–1.

Seeds

Draw

Finals

Top half

Bottom half

Qualifying

Seeds

Qualifiers

Qualifying draw

First qualifier

Second qualifier

Third qualifier

Fourth qualifier

External links
 Main draw
 Qualifying draw

Brisbane International - Singles
Women's Singles